A grain is a small, hard, dry fruit (caryopsis) – with or without an attached hull layer – harvested for human or animal consumption. A grain crop is a grain-producing plant. The two main types of commercial grain crops are cereals and legumes.

After being harvested, dry grains are more durable than other staple foods, such as starchy fruits (plantains, breadfruit, etc.) and tubers (sweet potatoes, cassava, and more). This durability has made grains well suited to industrial agriculture, since they can be mechanically harvested, transported by rail or ship, stored for long periods in silos, and milled for flour or pressed for oil. Thus, the grain market is a major global commodity market that includes crops such as maize, rice, soybeans, wheat and other grains.

Grains and cereal 

Grains and cereal are synonymous with caryopses, the fruits of the grass family. In agronomy and commerce, seeds or fruits from other plant families are called grains if they resemble caryopses. For example, amaranth is sold as "grain amaranth", and amaranth products may be described as "whole grains". The pre-Hispanic civilizations of the Andes had grain-based food systems, but at higher elevations none of the grains was a cereal. All three grains native to the Andes (kaniwa, kiwicha, and quinoa) are broad-leafed plants rather than grasses such as corn, rice, and wheat.

Classification

Cereal grains 

A cereal is any grass cultivated for the edible components of its grain (botanically, a type of fruit called a caryopsis), composed of the endosperm, germ, and bran. The term may also refer to the resulting grain itself (specifically "cereal grain"). Cereal grain crops are grown in greater quantities and provide more food energy worldwide than any other type of crop and are therefore staple crops. Edible grains from other plant families, such as buckwheat, quinoa and chia, are referred to as pseudocereals.

In their natural, unprocessed, whole grain form, cereals are a rich source of vitamins, minerals, carbohydrates, fats, oils, and protein. When processed by the removal of the bran and germ the remaining endosperm is mostly carbohydrate. In some developing countries, grain in the form of rice, wheat, millet, or maize constitutes a majority of daily sustenance. In developed countries, cereal consumption is moderate and varied but still substantial, primarily in the form of refined and processed grains.

Warm-season cereals

finger millet
fonio
foxtail millet
Japanese millet
Job's tears
kodo millet
maize (corn)
millet
pearl millet
proso millet
sorghum

Cool-season cereals

barley
oats
rice
rye
spelt
teff
triticale
wheat
wild rice

Pseudocereal grains 

Starchy grains from broadleaf (dicot) plant families:
amaranth (Amaranth family) also called kiwicha
buckwheat (Smartweed family)
chia (Mint family)
quinoa (Amaranth family, formerly classified as Goosefoot family)
kañiwa

Pulses 

Pulses or grain legumes, members of the pea family, have a higher protein content than most other plant foods, at around 20%, while soybeans have as much as 35%. As is the case with all other whole plant foods, pulses also contain carbohydrates and fat. Common pulses include:
chickpeas
common beans
common peas (garden peas)
fava beans
lentils
lima beans
lupins
mung beans
peanuts
pigeon peas
runner beans
soybeans

Oilseeds 
Oilseed grains are grown primarily for the extraction of their edible oil. Vegetable oils provide dietary energy and some essential fatty acids. They are also used as fuel and lubricants.

Mustard family

black mustard
India mustard
rapeseed (including canola)

Aster family

safflower
sunflower seed

Other families
flax seed (Flax family)
 hemp seed (Hemp family)
poppy seed (Poppy family)

Historical importance
Because grains are small, hard and dry, they can be stored, measured, and transported more readily than can other kinds of food crops such as fresh fruits, roots and tubers. The development of grain agriculture allowed excess food to be produced and stored easily which could have led to the creation of the first temporary settlements and the division of society into classes.

Trade

Occupational safety and health 
Those who handle grain at grain facilities may encounter numerous occupational hazards and exposures. Risks include grain entrapment, where workers are submerged in the grain and unable to remove themselves; explosions caused by fine particles of grain dust, and falls.

See also

 Ancient grains
 Cereals
 Domestication
 Grain drying
 Legume
 List of dried foods
 List of Five grains in world culture
 Mycoestrogen
 Perennial grain
 Staple foods
 Vegetable fats and oils
 Gluten

References

Edible nuts and seeds
Crops
Staple foods
 
Food ingredients
Types of food